Dragon Princess  is a 1975  karate  film directed by Yutaka Kohira.

Plot
The film opens with Isshin Higaki (Sonny Chiba) and his daughter Yumi Higaki (Etsuko Shihomi) being attacked by a rival karate master, Hironobu Nikaido (Bin Amatsu) who wants Isshin's job as top karate master. Nikaido teams up with four other masters and they manage to disable one of Isshin's arms and wound his eye with a kunai knife.  Alive but crippled Isshin and Yumi retreat to New York where he trains his daughter to avenge him and the death of a friend. After her father's death, Yumi returns to Tokyo to take her revenge. She enters a karate tournament funded by a corrupt business man, but Nikaido, seeking to assure his student's supremacy in the coming fight, sends his four top fighters to wipe out the rest of the competition. Eventually, Yumi, with the help of another karate student, Masahiko Okizaki (Yasuaki Kurata) kills Nikaido and his minions. Her arm is permanently disabled, keeping her from continuing her karate but allowing her to continue on with the rest of her life.

Cast
Etsuko Shihomi as Yumi Higaki
Sonny Chiba as Isshin Higaki
Yasuaki Kurata as Masahiko Okizaki
Jirō Chiba as Jiro Chinen
Bin Amatsu as Hironobu Nikaido
Masashi Ishibashi as Shiroge Oni
Tatsuya Kameyama as Baba
Shunsuke Kariya as Yokoi
Yoshi Katō as Kakuzen

Home media
On November 20, 2007, BCI Eclipse released the film in their Sonny Chiba Collection DVD set, which also includes Golgo 13: Assignment Kowloon, The Bullet Train, Karate Kiba, Karate Warriors, and Sister Street Fighter.

References

External links
 
 

1976 films
1976 martial arts films
Films directed by Yutaka Kohira
Japanese martial arts films
Karate films
Toei Company films
Films scored by Shunsuke Kikuchi

Japanese films about revenge
1970s Japanese films